The Ross R-6 is a tandem two-seat, high-wing glider that was designed by Harland Ross and first flown in 1956.

Design and development
Ross designed the R-6 as a two-seat sailplane with the intention of setting new multi-place records with it.

The R-6 was constructed with a metal fuselage, which was a departure from Ross's earlier designs. The passenger seat is behind the pilot's seat, aft of the wing spar and has no windows, visibility is provided by a removable plastic overhead dome. The wing features dive brakes. Originally taking off from a dolly and landing on a fixed skid, the R-6 later had a retractable monowheel landing gear installed.

Operational history
In one four-day period in 1958 Ross flew the R-6 to set four records. Two of the three World Records exceeded the standing single-place record at the time.

In 1959, Ross flew the R-6 solo from Kent, Texas to Farley, New Mexico for his diamond distance and won the Barringer Trophy

The R-6 was later owned by Bob Storck of Waldorf, Maryland who loaned it to the National Soaring Museum, where it is currently listed as in storage.

Aircraft on display
National Soaring Museum - the sole example.

Specifications (R-6 2-seater / single-seater)

See also

References

1950s United States sailplanes
Harland Ross aircraft
Aircraft first flown in 1956